Spyridon Mostras (born 23 October 1890, date of death unknown) was a Greek sports shooter. He competed in two events at the 1912 Summer Olympics.

References

1890 births
Year of death missing
Greek male sport shooters
Olympic shooters of Greece
Shooters at the 1912 Summer Olympics
Sportspeople from Athens
20th-century Greek people